PKP Linia Hutnicza Szerokotorowa sp. z o.o. is a company in the PKP Group which manages and operates the  (Broad Gauge Metallurgy Line), which runs for  from the Ukrainian border in Izow-Hrubieszów to Sławków Południowy (near Katowice).

, the company transported about 10 million tonnes of freight annually. The company owns 77 diesel locomotives (mainline and  shunters), 95 wagons, 50 broad gauge bogies, and 168 standard gauge bogies.

The company was founded in 2001 after splitting the once-unitary Polskie Koleje Państwowe (the national rail operator) into smaller companies.

See also 
 PKP Group
 Rail transport in Poland

Resources

External links 
 LHS fan website

Railway companies of Poland
Railway infrastructure managers
PKP Group companies